Mati Pari (born 4 September 1974) is a retired football (soccer) midfielder from Estonia. He played for several clubs, including FC Flora Tallinn, FC Levadia Tallinn and FC Flora Rakvere.

International career
Pari earned his first official cap for the Estonia national football team on 9 March 1994, when Estonia played Cyprus in a friendly match. He obtained a total number of 22 caps.
Pari was an assistant coach in FC Levadia in 2010 and a youth coach in 2011–2015. In 2016 he coached the youth team of JK Tabasalu. In 2017 he started as a youth coach in JK Tallinna Kalev.

References

External links

1974 births
Living people
Sportspeople from Viljandi
Estonian footballers
Estonia international footballers
Association football midfielders
FC Flora players
FCI Levadia Tallinn players
JK Tarvas Rakvere players
Meistriliiga players
Estonian football managers